This is a list of bridges and other crossings of the Colorado River from the Gulf of Mexico upstream to West Texas.

Crossings

References 

Crossings of the Colorado River (Texas)
Colorado River (Texas)
 
Colorado